The 10th Biathlon World Championships were held in Östersund, Sweden in February 1970.

Men's results

20 km individual

4 × 7.5 km relay

Medal table

References

Biathlon Results 1970

1970
Biathlon World Championships
International sports competitions hosted by Sweden
1970 in Swedish sport
Biathlon competitions in Sweden
Sports competitions in Östersund
February 1970 sports events in Europe